The Firefly of Tough Luck is an American 1917 silent film directed by E. Mason Hopper and written by J. G. Hawks. It was produced and released by the Triangle Film Corporation, and starred Alma Rubens and Charles Gunn.

Plot 
The Firefly (Rubens), a cabaret performer at one of New York City's biggest restaurants, finds herself out of work as businesses close along Broadway during World War I. She accepts a position as an entertainer in a desert mining town called Baxter Junction, where a surprise is in store for her.

Starring 

 Alma Rubens as The Firefly
 Charles Gunn as Danny Ward
 Walt Whitman as "Tough Luck" Baxter
 Darrell Foss as Bert Wilcox
 Jack Curtis as Happy Jack Clarke

Production 
The production was filmed at Triangle's Culver City studio as well as in the desert. Rubens and Whitman disliked working on location in the sun and heat of August, so Hopper tried to minimize time shooting outdoor scenes.

Release 
The film was noted as a box-office smash.

Preservation 
The film is now considered lost.

References 

1917 films
American silent feature films
Films directed by Alfred L. Werker
Films directed by E. Mason Hopper
Lost American films
Triangle Film Corporation films
1910s American films